Bourem Airport   is a small airport serving Bourem in Mali.

Airports in Mali